Rahima Naz (born 14 February 1986) is a Pakistani poet of Urdu and the Khowar language. The most prominent themes in Naz's poetry are love and feminism.

Biography
Naz was born in a village in Khot Valley, Torkhow, Chitral District, Khyber Pakhtunkhwa, Pakistan. She did her matriculation from Federal Government Public Girls High School Cherat. Naz started writing at an early age and published her first volume of poetry, Lala-e-Kuhsaar  to great acclaim, in 2011.

Naz is committed to girls right to education. She stands for women's rights and believes that women should have equal opportunities in every sector of life.

Works
 Lala-e-Kuhsaar

References

1986 births
Living people
People from Chitral District
Khowar poets
Pakistani women poets
21st-century Pakistani women writers
21st-century Pakistani poets
Abdul Wali Khan University Mardan alumni